Matthew Ian Foy (born 2 November 1998) is an English footballer who currently plays for  side St Ives Town, where he plays as a forward.

Club career
Foy joined Cambridge United at under-9 level after a spell with local side Wisbech Town. In November 2016, Foy signed his first professional contract, agreeing to a three-year deal. Following this, Foy went onto make his first-team debut during Cambridge's EFL Trophy tie against Scunthorpe United, in which he replaced Joe Pigott in the 2–0 defeat. Since making his debut in November 2016, Foy has enjoyed loan spells at Cambridge City and St Neots Town. In November 2017, he was loaned out to Lowestoft Town for a month. On 3 August 2018, Foy signed for Chelmsford City on a one-month loan deal. On 31 August 2018, Foy joined Kettering Town on loan. Foy enjoyed a loan spell with Harlow Town during the 2018-19 season, making 27 appearances, and scoring 14 goals.

Career statistics

Club

References

External links

1998 births
Living people
People from Huntingdon
English footballers
Association football forwards
Cambridge United F.C. players
Cambridge City F.C. players
St Neots Town F.C. players
Lowestoft Town F.C. players
Chelmsford City F.C. players
Kettering Town F.C. players
Harlow Town F.C. players
St Ives Town F.C. players
English Football League players
Southern Football League players